Maciej Soboń (born April 12, 1979 in Kłodzko) is a retired Polish footballer.

Career

Club
In July 2011, he joined Chrobry Głogów on a two-year contract.

References

External links
 

1979 births
Living people
Polish footballers
GKS Katowice players
Chrobry Głogów players
Górnik Polkowice players
People from Kłodzko
Sportspeople from Lower Silesian Voivodeship
Association football midfielders